The Ministry of Internal Affairs (MIA) is a government ministry of Kiribati, headquartered in South Tarawa.

The minister is responsible of:
Local government
Support services to Island Councils
Decentralization
Rural Development for all Islands except Line and Phoenix Islands,
Electoral Commission and National Elections
Community Development
Police Services Communication and Improvement Fund
Health Services Communication and Improvement Fund
Cultural Affairs and Museum 
Village Bank
Outer Island Development Program
Liquor

Ministers
1979
2003
Kouraiti Beniato (2007–2011)
Teima Onorio (2011–2016) as Internal and Social Affairs 
Kobebe Taitai (2018–2020)
Boutu Bateriki (2020–)

External links
 MIA

References

Presidency of Kiribati

Government of Kiribati
Internal affairs ministries